Ahmad Khorram (born 1950) is an Iranian politician.

Khorram was the Minister of Roads and Transportation, under President Mohammad Khatami, until October 3, 2004, when he was impeached by the Majlis of Iran by 188 votes out of 258 present members of the parliament. He was replaced by Ahmad Sadegh-Bonab, as the temporary supervisor of the ministry.

Born in Chaharmahal va Bakhtiari, and having a bachelor's degree in Roads and Structures Engineering from the University of Tabriz, Khorram's previous posts in the Iranian government included the governorship of Hormozgan, Khuzestan, and Hamedan and vice ministership of the Ministry of Roads and Transportation.

References

Iranian governors
Government ministers of Iran
1950 births
Living people
Politicians from Isfahan
Impeached Iranian officials removed from office
Islamic Iran Participation Front politicians
Governors of Hamadan Province